

Federal elections

Presidential election

Presidential primaries

General election

Congressional elections

State elections

Georgia General Assembly

Georgia Public Service Commission 
Incumbent Democrat David Burgess defeated Republican Al Bartell and Libertarian Dick Withington for District 3. Incumbent Republican Stan Wise defeated Democrat Jim Boyd and Libertarian Wayne Parker for District 5. This was the first PSC election to use residency districts.

References 

2000 Georgia (U.S. state) elections